Glen Tilburn Cavaliero (7 June 1927 – 28 October 2019) was an English poet and critic.

Life
Glen Cavaliero was born of mixed Italian and north country English descent, and was educated at Tonbridge School in Kent. He studied Modern History at Magdalen College, Oxford, and was a staff member at Lincoln Theological College from 1956 to 1961 before matriculating as a mature student to read English at St Catharine's College, Cambridge in 1965.  He was awarded a Ph.D. from Cambridge in 1972. Cavaliero was subsequently a member of the Faculty of English at Cambridge University, a Fellow Commoner of St Catharine's College, a Fellow of the Royal Society of Literature, and the President of the Powys Society.

Bibliography
Criticism
John Cowper Powys, Novelist, Oxford University Press, 1973.
The Rural Tradition in the English Novel 1900-1939, Macmillan, 1977
A Reading of E. M. Forster, Macmillan, 1979
Charles Williams: Poet of Theology, Macmillan, 1983
The Supernatural and English Fiction, Oxford University Press, 1995
The Powys Family: Some Records of a Friendship, Cecil Woolf, 1999
The Alchemy of Laughter, Palgrave Macmillan, 2000

Poetry
The Ancient People, Carcanet Press, 1973
Paradise Stairway, Carcanet Press, 1977
Elegy for St Anne's, Warren House Press, 1982
Steeple on a Hill, Tartarus Press, 1997
Ancestral Haunt, Poetry Salzburg, 2002
The Christmas Robins and Other Poems, privately printed 2005
The Justice of the Night, Tartarus Press, 2007
Towards the Waiting Sun, Poetry Salzburg, 2011
The Flash of Weathercocks, Troubador, 2016

As editor
Beatrix Potter's Journal, Warne, 1986

Further reading
Critical contributions to the PN Review
Review of Cavaliero's Charles Williams: Poet of Theology, by Dimitri Phillips
Review of Cavaliero's The Justice of the Night, by William P. Simmons

References

External links
Glen Cavaliero
Glen Cavaliero on 1964 BBC Documentary, Marriage Today
Glen Cavaliero at St Catharine's College

Fellows of the Royal Society of Literature
1927 births
2019 deaths
Alumni of Magdalen College, Oxford
Alumni of St Catharine's College, Cambridge